Standings and results for Group F of the Top 16 phase of the 2006-07 Euroleague basketball tournament.

Standings

Fixtures and results
* = Overtime (one star per overtime period)

Game 1, February 14–15, 2007

Game 2, February 21–22, 2007

Game 3, February 28 - March 1, 2007

Game 4, March 7–8, 2007

Game 5, March 14–15, 2007

Game 6, March 21–22, 2007

References 

Group F
2006–07 in Spanish basketball
2006–07 in Turkish basketball
2006–07 in Greek basketball
2006–07 in Polish basketball